Floacism is a live album from the R&B duo Floetry released in 2003. It also includes 3 studio songs.

Track listing
 "Wanna B Where U R (Thisizzaluvsong) feat Mos Def"
 "Have Faith"
 "Tell Me When"
 "Big Ben"
 "Opera"
 "Sunshine (Intro)"
 "Sunshine"
 "If I Was A Bird"
 "Say Yes" (Intro)
 "Say Yes"
 "Getting Late"
 "Butterflies"
 "Floetic"
 "Hey You"

2003 live albums
Floetry albums
DreamWorks Records live albums